Oman Ama (sometimes written as Oman-ama and Omanama) is a rural locality in the Goondiwindi Region, Queensland, Australia.

Geography 

The Cunningham Highway passes through the locality from the north-east (Gore) to the west (Coolmunda). The South Western railway line runs loosely parallel and almost immediately south of the highway with the area being served by the Oman-ama railway station.

History 
The name Oman Ama is an Aboriginal name meaning "caught by the tail".

Brigalow Gully Provisional School opened  circa 1896. On 1 January 1909 it became Brigalow Gully State School. In 1913 it was renamed Oman-ama State School. The school closed circa 1935.

St David's Anglican Church was dedicated on 31 July 1905. It closed in 1972 but reopened on 28 July 1985. Its final closure on 30 July 2002 was approved by Assistant Bishop Nolan. In 2006, the church building was relocated to 330 Preston Boundary Road, Preston, where it is used as a wedding chapel.

In 2015-2016 Oman Ama was one of six communities being considered as Australia's first permanent nuclear waste disposal facility. The other sites were Sallys Flat (New South Wales), Hale (Northern Territory)  and three sites in South Australia: Cortlinye, Pinkawillinie and Barndioota. While some residents were open to the idea, many were opposed.

Education 
There are no schools in Oman Ama. The nearest school is Inglewood State School in Inglewood to the west which offers schooling from Prep to Year 10. Oman Ama is outside of any school district offering Years 11 and 12 schooling, the nearest being in Warwick to the north-east, Stanthorpe to the south-west and Goondiwindi to the west. Distance education or boarding school are other options.

References

External links 

 

Goondiwindi Region
Localities in Queensland